The 2008 Georgia Southern Eagles team represented Georgia Southern University in the 2008 NCAA Division I FCS football season. The Eagles were led by second year head coach Chris Hatcher and played their home games at Paulson Stadium. They are a member of the Southern Conference. They finished the season 6–5, 4–4 in Southern Conference play.

Schedule

References

Georgia Southern
Georgia Southern Eagles football seasons
Georgia Southern Eagles football